Bosso is a village and rural commune in Niger. As of 2011, the commune had a total population of 52,177 people. It lies on the Nigerian border.

In June 2013, between 5,000 and 10,000 refugees arrived here, fleeing fighting between Boko Haram and the Nigerian Armed Forces in Borno State of Nigeria. Most blamed the military for the excessive violence and human rights violations.

Climate
Köppen-Geiger climate classification system classifies its climate as hot desert (BWh).

References

Communes of Niger